Joseph Mermans (16 February 1922 in Merksem – 20 January 1996 in Wildert), usually referred to as Jef Mermans (nicknamed "The Bomber") was a football striker from Belgium, who played much of his career at Anderlecht, with whom he won seven Belgian Championship titles and finished top scorer of this competition three times. He played 399 games and scored 367 goals in first division.

Mermans played 56 matches with the Belgium national football team, 2 of which in the 1954 FIFA World Cup. He is also the 4th top scorer ever for the Belgium national team with 27 goals.

Early career
In the early 1930s, the young Mermans, along with a couple of friends, could not afford to become members of FC Antwerp. Eventually, the boys tried their luck at Tubantia F.A.C. (a small club in the Antwerp suburb) and managed to force themselves a way into the youth team.

Five years later, Mermans entered the first team.  His progress caught attention of the federal coach and Jef was selected for a Belgium B squad match against Luxembourg in January 1939. At this point, he received twice in two years a proposal to play in the Beerschot team, but Tubantia Borgerhout refused.

A member of the Anderlecht staff arrived at Borgerhout in 1942 with a blank check that was filled in with the record sum of 125,000 Belgian francs in a quarter of an hour.

Anderlecht career
On his arrival at Anderlecht, the Championship was quite erratic due to the World War II, but he helped Anderlecht in becoming a regular team. In 1947, Mermans was the key player in the conquest of the first Anderlecht title in first division as he scored 38 goals (succeeding to Bert De Cleyn as top scorer). He was top European goalscorer of the season 1949-1950 netted 37 goals.
At the peak of his career, Anderlecht received offers from A.S. Roma, Torino Calcio, Atalanta Bergamo, Real Madrid, S.S. Lazio and Atlético Madrid but refused them all.

Late career
In 1957, the Bomber, as he was called for his powerful strikes, left Anderlecht for the small K. Olse Merksem club in his native town. With him, the club promoted from 3rd to 2nd division and even finished 4th in 1960 for its first season at this level.  Later on, the club was renamed Olse Mermans to celebrate the player.

Honours

Player 
RSC Anderlecht

 Belgian First Division: 1946–47, 1948–49, 1949–50, 1950–51, 1953–54, 1954–55, 1955–56

Individual 

 Belgian First Division top scorer: 1946–47 (39 goals), 1947–48 (23 goals), 1949–50 (37 goals)
 Belgian Golden Shoe: 2nd (1954), 3rd (1955)
 Belgian Golden Shoe of the 20th Century (1995): 9th place
 Jef Mermansstadion in Merksem.

See also 
 List of men's footballers with 500 or more goals

References 

1922 births
1996 deaths
Belgian footballers
Belgium international footballers
1954 FIFA World Cup players
Association football forwards
R.S.C. Anderlecht players
Belgian Pro League players
People from Merksem
Footballers from Antwerp